www.kamalaofficial.com.br

Kamala band was formed in 2003, in Campinas/Brazil. Blending oriental harmonies, the strength of metal, music loaded with energy and an overwhelming stage presence, the powertrio has an impact onevery show and over the years, In addition to several festivals in Brazil, the band has already performed many European tours, including Portugal, Spain, France, Belgium, Netherlands, Germany, Switzerland and Poland, the band has been gathering fans and good reviews on the specialized media all over the world.

Band members

Current members 
 Raphael Olmos (Vocal/Guitar)
 Isabela Moraes (Vocal/Drums)
 Zé Cantelli (Bass)

Former members 
 Rodrigo Pines (Drums)
 Fábio Braga (Drums)
 Nicolas Andrade (Drums)
 Estevan Furlan (Drums)
 Ralph Migotto (Guitar)
 Andreas Dehn (Guitar)
 Luiz Moura (Guitar)
 Marcelo Canha (Bass)
 Adriano Martins (Bass)
 Ricardo Piccoli (Bass)
 André Rudge (Bass)
 Diego Valente (Bass)
 Victor Angelotti (Bass)
 Allan Malavasi (Bass / Vocals)

Discography

Demo
 Corrosive (2005)

Studio Albuns
 Kamala (2007)
 Fractal (2009)
 The Seven Deadly Chakras (2012)
 Mantra (2015)
 Consequences Of Our Past - Vol 1 (2017) EP
 Eyes Of Creation (2018)

Live Albuns
 Live In France (2019)

Singles

Aimless (2021)
Dukkha (2022) 
Forgive the Weak (2022)

External links
 
 
 
 

Musical groups established in 2003